Gregory Preciado (born January 18, 1983 in Walla Walla, Washington) is an American soccer player.

External links
 USL Pro profile

1983 births
Living people
American soccer players
American expatriate soccer players
Indiana Invaders players
Lobos BUAP footballers
Dayton Dutch Lions players
Expatriate footballers in Mexico
USL League Two players
USL Championship players
Soccer players from Washington (state)
Sportspeople from Walla Walla, Washington
Association football defenders